Lys Émilien Mousset (born 8 February 1996) is a French professional footballer who plays as a forward for  club Nîmes, on loan from Bundesliga club VfL Bochum.

Club career

Le Havre
Mousset joined the Le Havre academy in 2006, after playing for local clubs Soquence Graville and Havre Caucriauville. He began playing for the reserve side in 2012, where he impressed, before making his debut for the first team in 2014. Mousset would go on to score fourteen goals in thirty-six games for Le Havre.

AFC Bournemouth
On 30 June 2016, Mousset joined AFC Bournemouth from Le Havre for a €7.3 million transfer fee. He scored his first goal for Bournemouth in an FA Cup tie against Wigan Athletic on 6 January 2018.

Sheffield United 
On 21 July 2019, Mousset signed for newly promoted Premier League club Sheffield United. The Blades paid a club-record fee in the region of £10 million for Mousset, and he put pen to paper on a three-year contract. On 21 September 2019, He scored his first goal for Sheffield United in a 2–0 away win against Everton. On 30 September Wilder confirmed that Mousset's toe injury could keep him out for at least another two months. He still finished the 2019–20 season as joint highest scorer for Sheffield United along with Oli McBurnie on six goals, and joint highest assist provider along with Enda Stevens on four assists.

Loan to Salernitana
On 31 January 2022, Mousset was loaned to Salernitana in Serie A.

VfL Bochum
On 15 August 2022, Mousset signed a two-year contract with VfL Bochum in Germany. 

In January 2023, Mousset was suspended from the team. He was loaned out to Nîmes on 31 January.

International career
Mousset was born in France to a Senegalese father and a French mother, and is eligible for both countries. He made his France U20 debut in 2015.

Career statistics

References

External links
 
 

1996 births
French sportspeople of Senegalese descent
People from Montivilliers
Sportspeople from Seine-Maritime
Footballers from Normandy
Living people
French footballers
Association football forwards
France under-21 international footballers
France youth international footballers
Le Havre AC players
AFC Bournemouth players
Sheffield United F.C. players
U.S. Salernitana 1919 players
VfL Bochum players
Nîmes Olympique players
Ligue 2 players
Premier League players
English Football League players
Serie A players
French expatriate footballers
French expatriate sportspeople in England
Expatriate footballers in England
French expatriate sportspeople in Italy
Expatriate footballers in Italy
French expatriate sportspeople in Germany
Expatriate footballers in Germany